Jand Mahlo is a town in Gujar Khan Tehsil Punjab, Pakistan. Jand Mehlo is also chief town of Union Council Jand Mehlo which is an administrative subdivision of the Tehsil.

References

Populated places in Gujar Khan Tehsil
Union councils of Gujar Khan Tehsil